Apollophanes is a genus of running crab spiders that was first described by Octavius Pickard-Cambridge in 1898.

Species
 it contains fourteen species, found in the Caribbean, South America, Asia, Canada, Mexico, the United States, and Panama:
Apollophanes aztecanus Dondale & Redner, 1975 – Mexico
Apollophanes caribaeus Dondale & Redner, 1975 – Trinidad
Apollophanes crispus Dondale & Redner, 1975 – Panama
Apollophanes erectus Dondale & Redner, 1975 – Mexico
Apollophanes fitzroyi Baert, 2013 – Ecuador (Galapagos Is.)
Apollophanes gaucho Francisco, Ott & Teixeira, 2016 – Brazil
Apollophanes indistinctus Gertsch, 1933 – Mexico
Apollophanes lonesomegeorgei Baert, 2013 – Ecuador (Galapagos Is.)
Apollophanes longipes (O. Pickard-Cambridge, 1896) – Mexico
Apollophanes macropalpus (Paik, 1979) – Russia (West Siberia to Far East), Korea
Apollophanes margareta Lowrie & Gertsch, 1955 – USA, Canada
Apollophanes punctatus (Bryant, 1948) – Hispaniola
Apollophanes punctipes (O. Pickard-Cambridge, 1891) (type) – USA to Panama
Apollophanes texanus Banks, 1904 – USA, Mexico

See also
 List of Philodromidae species

References

Further reading

 
 
 
 
 
 
 
 
 

Araneomorphae genera
Philodromidae
Taxa named by Octavius Pickard-Cambridge